"Where's Your Love" is a song by Craig David from his album, Greatest Hits. It features vocals from rapper Tinchy Stryder and singer Rita Ora (although her vocals are not officially credited). It was made available for digital download only, on 10 November 2008 in both Ireland and the United Kingdom. The record is known for the chorus that has been used on various other underground UK garage tracks, Craig David is thought to be paying homage to the genre that made him a star. The song debuted at number 58 on the UK Singles Chart.

The song mainly samples the intro from the SE22 mix of "Hold On" by Colours and Stephen Emmanuel, only increasing the tempo.

Music video
A music video for "Where's Your Love" was directed by Steve Kemsley. It features David singing with Tinchy Stryder rapping and vocals from Rita Ora, with lyrics bouncing around a white background, with the occasional corridor with only David singing. The video was uploaded and released to the streaming media website YouTube on 17 October 2008.

Track listings
Digital download
"Where's Your Love" (featuring Tinchy Stryder and Rita Ora) – 4:34
"Where's Your Love" (featuring Tinchy Stryder) – 3:35

Charts

References

2008 singles
Craig David songs
Tinchy Stryder songs
Warner Records singles
Sire Records singles
2008 songs
Songs written by Craig David
Songs written by Fraser T. Smith
Songs with music by Tinchy Stryder
UK garage songs